Carlsberg may refer to:

Places
 Carlsberg (district), a district in Copenhagen, Denmark
 Carlsberg station, its train station
 Carlsberg, Germany, a municipality in Rhineland-Palatinate, Germany
 Carlsberg Fjord, Greenland

Other uses
 Carlsberg Group, a Danish brewing company founded in 1847
 Carlsberg Lager
 Carlsberg Foundation, a Carlsberg Group shareholder and funder of the Carlsberg Laboratory
 Carlsberg Laboratory, a Danish laboratory for advancing biochemical knowledge
 Carlsberg Cup, a competition organized by the Portuguese League for Professional Football
 5890 Carlsberg, an asteroid

See also
 Ny Carlsberg Glyptotek, an art museum in Copenhagen, Denmark
 Karlsberg (disambiguation)